Michael Hennrich (born 14 January 1965) is a German lawyer and politician of the Christian Democratic Union (CDU) who served as a member of the Bundestag from the state of Baden-Württemberg from 2002 to 2023.

Political career 
Hennrich became a member of the Bundestag in the 2002 German federal election, always being directly elected in the Nürtingen constituency He was a member of the Health Committee, where he served as his parliamentary group's rapporteur on pharmaceutical supply.

In addition to his committee assignments, Hennrich was also part of the German Parliamentary Friendship Group for Relations with Arabic-Speaking States in the Middle East, which is in charge of maintaining inter-parliamentary relations with Bahrain, Irak, Yemen, Jordan, Qatar, Kuwait, Lebanon, Oman, Saudi Arabia, Syria, United Arab Emirates, Palestinian territories.

Hennrich became a member of the German delegation to the Parliamentary Assembly of the Council of Europe (PACE) since 2010. In the Assembly, he served on the Committee on Culture, Science, Education and Media (2014–2018; since 2022); the Sub-Committee on the Cultural Heritage (2010–2012); the Sub-Committee on Development Issues (2010–2012).

In July 2022, Hennrich announced that he would resign from active politics by early 2023 and instead become managing director of the German Medicines Manufacturers´ Association (BAH).

Alexander Föhr succeeded him in the Bundestag.

Other activities 
 Süddeutsche Lebensversicherung, Member of the supervisory board (since 2016)
 Federal Network Agency for Electricity, Gas, Telecommunications, Post and Railway (BNetzA), Member of the advisory board (2003-2008)

Political positions
In June 2017, Hennrich voted against Germany's introduction of same-sex marriage.

Ahead of the Christian Democrats’ leadership election, Hennrich publicly endorsed in 2020 Jens Spahn to succeed Annegret Kramp-Karrenbauer as the party's chair.

References

External links 

  
 Bundestag biography 

1965 births
Living people
Members of the Bundestag for Baden-Württemberg
Members of the Bundestag 2021–2025
Members of the Bundestag 2017–2021
Members of the Bundestag 2013–2017
Members of the Bundestag 2009–2013
Members of the Bundestag 2005–2009
Members of the Bundestag 2002–2005
Members of the Bundestag for the Christian Democratic Union of Germany